Assid Abraham Corban (25 August 1864 – 2 December 1941) was a New Zealand pedlar, importer, viticulturist and wine-maker. He was born in Shweir, Lebanon on 25 August 1864. He founded Corbans, now one of New Zealand's oldest and largest wineries.

Corban arrived in New Zealand in 1892. In 1902 he purchased for £320 a  block of land in Henderson, Auckland, although at the time this was quite some distance from what was known as Auckland. He named the block of land Mt Lebanon Vineyards.

The first vintage was in 1908, coinciding with the local electorate voting in prohibition, meaning he was unable to sell wine from the property. Assid's son Wadier took over wine-making in 1916. By the 1920s the Corban family were the largest winemakers in New Zealand.

Corban died in 1941. He was buried at Waikumete Cemetery in Glen Eden in a mausoleum that was built one year after his death, due to labour and materials shortages caused by World War II. His tomb was broken into in the early 1990s. In 1997, Corban was inducted into the New Zealand Business Hall of Fame.

One of Corban's descendants, Assid Khaleel Corban, became a West Auckland local-body politician and rose to become the mayor of Waitakere City.

References

1864 births
1941 deaths
Burials at Waikumete Cemetery
Viticulturists
New Zealand winemakers
Lebanese emigrants to New Zealand